Parkinsonia africana, the green-hair tree, is a species of flowering plant in the family Fabaceae, occurring in South Africa, Botswana and Namibia. It is a bush growing 1–3m tall with green bark that allows for photosynthesis when the leaves are shed. It produces yellow flowers and yellow to brown pods. The wood does not crack when hot and is used to make smoking pipes.

References

africana
Flora of Botswana
Flora of Namibia
Flora of South Africa